Brownswood Recordings is a London-based independent record label founded by Gilles Peterson in 2006. The label has released an eclectic range of music, reflecting Peterson's diverse musical taste.

The roster includes Ben Westbeech, Ghostpoet, José James, Skinny Pelembe, Mala, The Heritage Orchestra, Anushka, Gang Colours, Daymé Arocena, Yussef Kamaal, Shabaka and the Ancestors, Zara McFarlane.

References

External links
 – official site

 
British record labels
Record labels established in 2006
Drum and bass record labels
Jazz record labels